The Metals Company, formerly DeepGreen Metals, is a Canadian mining startup founded in 2011 by David and Robert Heydon. The company is focused on the deep sea mining of seafloor polymetallic nodules.

In March 2021, DeepGreen Metals revealed it will be acquired by Sustainable Opportunities Acquisition Corp (SOAC) in a $2.9 billion deal. Baird Maritime noted that The Metals Company had no revenue or production as of April 2021, and highlighted the risky nature of the company's commercialization efforts: "Nobody has successfully managed to commercially harvest the nickel, copper, manganese, and cobalt from the nodules in 4,500 metres of water since interest was first stimulated in seabed mining in the 1970s." 

Industry observers have called into question the company's "green" positioning in order to capitalize on a surge in environmentally-friendly investments. The Wall Street Journal noted that the company's CEO, Gerard Barron, previously backed another deep sea mining company that "lost a half-billion dollars of investor money, got crosswise with a South Pacific government, destroyed sensitive seabed habitat and ultimately went broke".

Many scientists have expressed concerns over the inherent risks and lack of data about the possible consequences of deep-sea mining. In response to DeepGreen's efforts in Nauru, over 400 scientists signed a statement in opposition of deep-sea mining, arguing that it would result in the “loss of biodiversity and ecosystem functioning that would be irreversible on multi-generational timescales.” DeepGreen published an open letter defending its practices after four major corporations–BMW, Volvo, Google, and Samsung SDI–supported a World Wildlife Fund call for a moratorium on deep-sea mining.

References

Mining companies of Canada
Underwater mining